SACTA refers to Sistema Automatizado de Control del Tránsito Aéreo, or Automatic Air Traffic Control System. It is 
owned by ENAIRE and was developed by Indra.

Aviation_in_Spain